Loma Rica (Spanish for "Rich Hill") is a census-designated place (CDP) in Yuba County, California, United States. The population was 2,368 at the 2010 census, up from 2,075 at the 2000 census.

Geography

Demographics

2010
The 2010 United States Census reported that Loma Rica had a population of 2,368. The racial makeup of Loma Rica was 2,085 (88.0%) White, 20 (0.8%) African American, 60 (2.5%) Native American, 20 (0.8%) Asian, 2 (0.1%) Pacific Islander, 52 (2.2%) from other races, and 129 (5.4%) from two or more races. Hispanic or Latino of any race were 211 persons (8.9%).

The Census reported that 2,368 people (100% of the population) lived in households, 0 (0%) lived in non-institutionalized group quarters, and 0 (0%) were institutionalized.

There were 885 households, out of which 264 (29.8%) had children under the age of 18 living in them, 577 (65.2%) were opposite-sex married couples living together, 66 (7.5%) had a female householder with no husband present, 28 (3.2%) had a male householder with no wife present.  There were 44 (5.0%) unmarried opposite-sex partnerships, and 5 (0.6%) same-sex married couples or partnerships. 161 households (18.2%) were made up of individuals, and 75 (8.5%) had someone living alone who was 65 years of age or older. The average household size was 2.68.  There were 671 families (75.8% of all households); the average family size was 3.03.

The population was spread out, with 508 people (21.5%) under the age of 18, 151 people (6.4%) aged 18 to 24, 424 people (17.9%) aged 25 to 44, 865 people (36.5%) aged 45 to 64, and 420 people (17.7%) who were 65 years of age or older.  The median age was 47.4 years. For every 100 females, there were 98.7 males.  For every 100 females age 18 and over, there were 97.2 males.

The homeowner vacancy rate was 3.1%; the rental vacancy rate was 11.8%.  1,998 people (84.4% of the population) lived in owner-occupied housing units and 370 people (15.6%) lived in rental housing units.

2000
As of the census of 2000, there were 2,075 people, 756 households, and 603 families residing in the CDP. The racial makeup of the CDP was 89.78% White, 0.43% African American, 2.31% Native American, 0.87% Asian, 0.19% Pacific Islander, 1.25% from other races, and 5.16% from two or more races. Hispanic or Latino of any race were 5.98% of the population.

There were 756 households, out of which 30.6% had children under the age of 18 living with them, 68.5% were married couples living together, 8.7% had a female householder with no husband present, and 20.2% were non-families. 16.0% of all households were made up of individuals, and 8.3% had someone living alone who was 65 years of age or older.  The average household size was 2.74 and the average family size was 3.03.

In the CDP, the population was spread out, with 24.9% under the age of 18, 5.7% from 18 to 24, 22.4% from 25 to 44, 32.0% from 45 to 64, and 15.1% who were 65 years of age or older.  The median age was 43 years. For every 100 females, there were 94.5 males.  For every 100 females age 18 and over, there were 92.0 males.

The median income for a household in the CDP was $46,797, and the median income for a family was $52,250. Males had a median income of $50,100 versus $26,518 for females. The per capita income for the CDP was $27,420.  About 6.7% of families and 11.2% of the population were below the poverty line, including 23.2% of those under age 18 and 5.7% of those age 65 or over.

Government

References

External links
South Yuba County Live Weather and Scanner Feed
Loma Rica on the Yuba-Sutter local wiki

Census-designated places in Yuba County, California
Census-designated places in California